Edgbaston is a district of Birmingham.

Edgbaston may also refer to:

Edgbaston (ward), an electoral ward of the Birmingham City Council
Edgbaston Cricket Ground, a cricket ground
Edgbaston Reserve, an Australian nature reserve
Birmingham Edgbaston (UK Parliament constituency), a UK parliament seat